The Catholic Church in the Cape Verde is part of the worldwide Catholic Church, under the spiritual leadership of the Pope in Rome. There are over 430,000 Catholics in the country which represents over 90% of the total population. The country is divided into two dioceses: Mindelo and Santiago de Cabo Verde.

History
The Catholic Church was established by Portuguese traders in 1533 on the island. Diplomatic relations between the Vatican and Cape Verde were established in 1976. The Diocese of Mindelo was divided from the original Diocese of Santiago in 2003, creating the current configuration of two diocese covering the island country. In 2011, an agreement was signed between the Government of Cape Verde and the Vatican creating a legal foundation for the Catholic Church in the country, allowed for Catholic schools, and a church role in formalizing marriages. On February 14, 2015, Pope Francis made Bishop Arlindo Gomes the first Cardinal from Cape Verde.

See also 
 Christianity in Cape Verde

References

External links
 GigaCatholic Information

 
Cape Verde